The City of Footscray was a local government area about  west of Melbourne, the state capital of Victoria, Australia. Its civic centre, after which it was named, was Footscray.

History

Footscray was first incorporated as a municipality on 10 June 1859, and was made a borough in 1863. It became a town on 25 February 1887, and was proclaimed a city on 23 January 1891. On 6 January 1922 and 5 February 1941, Footscray annexed land previously part of the Shire of Werribee, which became the West Ward (later to be known as Kingsville Ward). Further additions to this ward were made at the expense of the City of Williamstown, on 12 May 1943.

On 15 December 1994, the City of Footscray was abolished, and along with parts of the City of Sunshine, was merged into the newly created City of Maribyrnong. The only exception was the suburb of South Kingsville, which was transferred to the City of Hobsons Bay.

Wards

At dissolution, the City of Footscray was divided into four wards, each electing three councillors:
 North West Ward
 North Ward
 South Ward
 Kingsville Ward (formerly West Ward)

Prior to the 1988 elections, an additional Middle Ward existed.

Suburbs
 Footscray*
 Kingsville
 Maribyrnong (shared with the City of Sunshine)
 Seddon
 South Kingsville
 Spotswood (shared with the City of Williamstown)
 West Footscray
 Yarraville
 Maidstone

* Council seat.

Population

* Estimate in the 1958 Victorian Year Book.

References

External links
 Victorian Places - Footscray and Footscray City

Footscray
City of Maribyrnong
1859 establishments in Australia
1994 disestablishments in Australia